This is a list of electoral results for the Division of Corinella (1990–96) in Australian federal elections from the division's creation in 1990 until its abolition in 1996.

Members

Election results

Elections in the 1990s

1993

1990

References

 Australian Electoral Commission. Federal election results
 Carr, Adam. Psephos

Australian federal electoral results by division